Hermanville-sur-Mer is a commune in the Calvados department in the Normandy region in northwestern France.

Population

Sights
 13th century church
 Commonwealth war cemetery
 Old village centre
 Villa la Bluette, an 1899 villa by architect Hector Guimard
 Villa La Houle
 Manoir de Prébois

Normandy landings
The beach of Hermanville, part of the area codenamed Sword, was one of the targets of Operation Overlord on 6 June 1944. The Cod German stronghold was located on the coast. A Norwegian destroyer, the HNoMS Svenner, sank in front of Hermanville.

The sector at Hermanville was known as Queen Beach where elements of the British 3rd Division landed. The South Lancashire Regiment landed on Queen White and East Yorkshire Regiment on Queen Red; by 10:00 the village had been cleared. Offshore from Hermanville a Gooseberry was established, this consisted of a breakwater formed with ships sunk into position, including the French battleship Courbet.

Twin towns
Hermanville is twinned with:
 Tangmere, England
 Nominingue, Canada, since 2002

Personalities
Hermanville-sur-Mer was the birthplace of:
 Jean François Sarrazin (1611?–1654), author
 Alain Touraine (born 1925), sociologist

See also
Communes of the Calvados department

References

External links

 Tourism office webpage
Memorials to the war

Communes of Calvados (department)
Calvados communes articles needing translation from French Wikipedia
Populated coastal places in France